Last Train Home may refer to:

Film
 Last Train Home (film), a 2009 documentary directed by Lixin Fan
 Last Train Home, a television film starring Noam Zylberman

Music
 Last Train Home (album), a 2010 album by Foghat, also a song on the album
 Last Train Home EP, a 2009 EP by Ryan Star, or the title song
 "Last Train Home" (John Mayer song), 2021
 "Last Train Home" (Lostprophets song), 2004
 Pat Metheny Group Essential Collection: Last Train Home, a 2015 Pat Metheny Group compilation album
"Last Train Home", an unreleased single by Shaheen Jafargholi
"Last Train Home", song by Network 3
 "Last Train Home", an instrumental by the Pat Metheny Group from Still Life (Talking)